Lieutenant General Ian Rimbault Gleeson  (15 August 1934 – 7 June 2021) was a South African Army officer who served as Chief of the Defence Staff.

He graduated from the Military Academy after attending Christian Brothers College in Pretoria and joined the Army in 1954. He became Officer Commanding 2 South African Infantry Battalion in 1971 and in 1972 OC Walvis Bay military base, and in July 1976 became GOC 101 Task Force. He then became Chief of Army Staff Operations on 15 January 1978 before taking on the recreated post of Chief of Defence Force Staff.

He retired in February 1990.

The post-Apartheid Truth and Reconciliation Commission found that when General Johannes Geldenhuys and Gleeson were informed that the SADF and Security Branch had assassinated Dr Fabian Ribeiro and his wife Florence Ribeiro on 1 December 1986 they failed to pass this information onto the Attorney-General or the police. The commission concluded that they both "acted in an obstructive way for which they are legally responsible".

Awards and decorations 
General Gleeson has been awarded the following:

References

1934 births
2021 deaths
South African Army generals